Beaulieu is a Brussels Metro station on the eastern branch of line 5. It is located in the municipality of Auderghem, in the eastern part of Brussels, Belgium.

The station opened in 1976. Until 1977, it was the eastern terminus of what was line 1A, when the extension to Demey station was opened. In 1985 the line was further extended to Herrmann-Debroux. In April 2009 this branch became part of line 5. The station takes its name from the nearby Avenue de Beaulieu.

External links

Brussels metro stations
Railway stations opened in 1976
Auderghem